Khumar may refer to:

 Khumar, a ruined fortress in Northern Caucasus.
 Khumar Barabankvi, an Urdu poet and lyricist from Barabanki, Uttar Pradesh, India
 Khumara Church, an early 10th-century church sited on the Kuban River, Russia